The Chapel of the Holy Cross is a Roman Catholic chapel built from 1954 to 1956 into the red rock buttes of Sedona, Arizona, within the Coconino National Forest. It was inspired and commissioned by local rancher and sculptor Marguerite Brunswig Staude, and was designed by August K. Strotz of the firm of Anshen & Allen, with Richard Hein of the firm as the project architect.  The chapel is under the auspices of the episcopal see of the Roman Catholic Diocese of Phoenix and its ministry is conducted by St. John Vianney Parish, Sedona.

The chapel was added to the National Register of Historic Places in 2011.

History 
The chapel was inspired and commissioned by local rancher and sculptor Marguerite Brunswig Staude, who had been inspired in 1932 by the newly constructed Empire State Building to build such a church. After an attempt to do so in Budapest, Hungary – with the help of Lloyd Wright, son of architect Frank Lloyd Wright – was abandoned due to the outbreak of World War II, she decided to build the church in her native region.

The chapel's design is by architect August K. Strotz, and the project architect was Richard Hein, both of the Anshen & Allen firm. The chapel is built on Coconino National Forest land; Senator Barry Goldwater assisted Staude in obtaining a special-use permit. The construction supervisor was Fred Coukos of the William Simpson Construction Company, who built the chapel in 18 months at a cost of $300,000. Upwards of 25 tons of rock was moved without the use of dynamite. The chapel was completed in 1956.

The American Institute of Architects gave the Chapel its Award of Honor in 1957. In the sculptor's words, "Though Catholic in faith, as a work of art the Chapel has a universal appeal. Its doors will ever be open to one and all, regardless of creed, that God may come to life in the souls of all men and be a living reality."

In 2007, Arizonans voted the chapel to be one of the Seven Man-Made Wonders of Arizona.

Architectural features 
Upon arrival, visitors walk up a ramp from the parking area to the chapel. The long, curved ramp is constructed of textured concrete.

The main feature of the chapel is a 90 ft (27.4 m) tall iron cross on the southwestern wall, which serves both aesthetic and structural purposes. Staude was inspired by the powerful image of the steel framework in the Empire State Building and other skyscrapers. Her idea for the cross was carried out by sculptor Keith Monroe, from San Francisco. The cross holds both the altar and Corpus on the interior.

The walls and cross are constructed with reinforced coarse-aggregate concrete, 1 foot (0.3 m) in thickness. Inside and out, the walls were sandblasted to unveil the textured aggregate. To reduce glare, smokey-gray-colored glass is utilized at the two ends of the chapel. The floor is made of concrete, which is trowel-finished. The front doors are constructed of aluminum with horn-shaped handles.

The effect of the materials pallet combined with the simple angled shapes in the chapel creates an impression of grandeur and strength. This is fitting, as it sits at the base of a 1,500 ft (457.2 m) cliff and is surrounded by massive pieces of sandstone.

The chapel seats up to 150 people. The confessional, office, two sacristies, and services are located in the basement of the building.

Gallery

References 
Notes

Bibliography
 "Drama in the Desert." Architectural Forum, December 1956, pp. 97–99
 "Chapel Crowns Arizona Eminence." Progressive Architecture, October 1956, p. 91
 "Chapel of the Holy Cross." Architectural Record, October 1956, pp. 173–182.

External links 

 Page describing Chapel of the Holy Cross
 



Sedona, Arizona
Roman Catholic chapels in the United States
Roman Catholic churches in Arizona
Buildings and structures in Yavapai County, Arizona
National Register of Historic Places in Coconino County, Arizona
Properties of religious function on the National Register of Historic Places in Arizona
Roman Catholic churches completed in 1956
Tourist attractions in Yavapai County, Arizona
Anshen and Allen buildings
Modernist architecture in Arizona
20th-century Roman Catholic church buildings in the United States